Jonathan or Jon Cohen may refer to:

 L. Jonathan Cohen (1923–2006), British philosopher
 Jonathan Cohen (actor) (active since 2009), French actor
 Jonathan Cohen (conductor) (born 1977), British conductor and cellist
 Jonathan Cohen (musician) (active since 1967), British musician known from children's television programmes
 Jonathan Cohen (television executive) (active since 2009), American television executive
 Jonathan Cohen (diplomat) (active since 1986), American diplomat
 Jonathan D. Cohen (born 1955), American neuroscientist
 Jon Cohen (writer),  American novelist and screenwriter
 Jon Cohen (entrepreneur), American music and media executive
 Jon Cohen (physician), American physician and business executive

See also
 Jonathan Cohn (21st century), magazine editor
 John Cohen (disambiguation)